Bassim Abbas Gatea Al-Ogaili (born 1 July 1982) is an Iraqi former professional footballer who last played for Al-Shorta.

Career statistics

International 
Scores and results list Iraq's goal tally first.

Honours 
Al-Talaba
Iraqi Premier League: 2001–02
Iraq FA Cup: 2001–02, 2002–03
Iraqi Super Cup: 2002

Umm-Salal
Emir of Qatar Cup: 2007–08

Iraq
West Asian Football Federation Championship: 2002
AFC Asian Cup: 2007

Individual
AFC Asian Cup Best Defender: 2007
Lebanese Premier League Team of the Season: 2006–07

References

External links 
 
 
 

1982 births
Living people
Sportspeople from Baghdad
Expatriate footballers in Lebanon
Iraqi expatriate footballers
Iraqi footballers
Al-Talaba SC players
Iraq international footballers
Footballers at the 2004 Summer Olympics
Olympic footballers of Iraq
2004 AFC Asian Cup players
2007 AFC Asian Cup players
2009 FIFA Confederations Cup players
2011 AFC Asian Cup players
AFC Asian Cup-winning players
Expatriate footballers in Iran
Expatriate footballers in Turkey
Expatriate footballers in Qatar
Nejmeh SC players
Umm Salal SC players
Al-Arabi SC (Qatar) players
Diyarbakırspor footballers
Konyaspor footballers
Esteghlal Ahvaz players
Qatar Stars League players
Amanat Baghdad players
Iraqi expatriate sportspeople in Iran
Iraqi expatriate sportspeople in Turkey
Iraqi expatriate sportspeople in Qatar
Association football fullbacks
Al-Shorta SC players
Iraqi expatriate sportspeople in Lebanon
Lebanese Premier League players